Synnøve Gleditsch (née Synnøve Tanvik, June 16, 1908 – December 7, 1980) was a Norwegian actress.

Life and work
Synnøve Gleditsch was the daughter of the arsenal manager Nils Tanvik (1872–1969) and Kristine Eian (1875–1925). She debuted at the National Theater in 1928, where she was engaged until 1932. After this, Gleditsch was engaged at the Søilen Theater from 1934 to 1935, the Trøndelag Theater from 1937 to 1942, and the Edderkoppen Theater from 1949 to 1953; during this time she also had guest performances at many other theaters. Gleditsch also worked as a cabaret and revue artist, including at Chat Noir.

During the Second World War, Synnøve Gleditsch had been scheduled to perform the song "Det skal lyse igjen over byen" (The Light Will Shine Again over the City) as the closing number in the Chat Noir revue Fra tid til annen in 1941. The state censorship body, established by the occupying forces, intervened after the rehearsal and stopped further performance of the number. The song later became known under the new title "Norge i rødt, hvitt og blått" (Norway in Red, White, and Blue).

Synnøve Gleditsch was married to Henry Gleditsch from 1932 to 1942, when he was executed by the Germans.

In the 1960s, Gleditsch worked at NRK's Television Theater. She made a name for herself in roles such as Lady Teazle in Henki Kolstad's Baktalelsens skole, Svanhild in Henrik Ibsen's Love's Comedy, Eliza in George Bernard Shaw's Pygmalion, Lavinia in Nils Kjær's Det lykkelige valg, and Adele in Johann Strauss's Die Fledermaus.

In addition to theater, she participated in 13 film and TV productions between 1949 and 1970. She made her film debut in the Norwegian version of Vi flyr på Rio.

Filmography 
 1949: Vi flyr på Rio as Helmer's mother
 1954: Aldri annet enn bråk as Mrs. Wang
 1954: I moralens navn as Ella Heymann, Otto's wife, Egil's mother
 1956: Ektemann alene as the office woman
 1960: Venner as a servant at the Smidt house
 1960: Veien tilbake as Jenny
 1962: Tonny
 1965: Skjær i sjøen Mrs. Ås, Marit's mother

NRK Television Theater
 1961: Den store barnedåpen as Miss Jahr
 1961: Mester Pierre Pathelin as Giullemette, Pathelin's wife
 1963: Kranes konditori  as Gudrun Buck
 1969: Huset  på grensen as the mother-in-law
 1970: Selma Brøter as the boarding house operator

References

External links
 
 Synnøve Gleditsch at the Swedish Film Database
 Synnøve Gleditsch at Sceneweb
 Synnøve Gleditsch at Filmfront

1908 births
1980 deaths
20th-century Norwegian actresses